Haydon Warren-Gash (born 8 August 1949) is a retired British diplomat, and a noted lepidopterist who has described several new species.

Diplomatic career
Haydon Boyd Warren-Gash was educated at Sidney Sussex College, Cambridge. He joined the Foreign and Commonwealth Office (FCO) in 1971 and after language training at SOAS served at Ankara, Madrid and Paris as well as at the FCO. He was deputy High Commissioner at Nairobi 1991–1994; head of the Southern Europe department at the FCO 1994–1997; Ambassador to Côte d’Ivoire, Niger, Burkina Faso and Liberia 1997–2001 (during which he had to deal with a crisis when four Britons were among a group taken hostage by Liberian rebels); Ambassador to Morocco and Mauritania 2002–2005; and Ambassador to Colombia 2005–2008.

Lepidopterology
Warren-Gash is a lepidopterist. While he was ambassador to Colombia he was accused of collecting rare butterflies without a licence, which he denied.  He has described the following species:
Cymothoe hartigi vanessae
Euphaedra cyparissa nimbina
Euphaedra sarcoptera ferrea
Euphaedra sarcoptera styx
Euriphene taigola
Iolaus alexanderi
Lepidochrysops labeensis
Liptena bia
Liptena seyboui
Various species are named after Warren-Gash:
Baliochila warrengashi
Bebearia warrengashi
Euptera dorothea warrengashi 
Pseudaletis agrippina warrengashi

Publications
New records of Lycaenidae from Kenya: a postscript (1993), in Metamorphosis (Official Journal of the Lepidopterists' Society of Africa) Volume 4, Issue 3: 113
The liptenids of the Banco Forest: a case study in conservation (1999), in Metamorphosis (Official Journal of the Lepidopterists' Society of Africa) Volume 10, Issue 2: 75-80Collecting and conserving in Côte d'Ivoire, West Africa (2002), in Metamorphosis (Official Journal of the Lepidopterists' Society of Africa) Volume 13, Issue 2: 44-50

References

WARREN-GASH, Haydon Boyd, Who's Who 2014'', A & C Black, 2014; online edn, Oxford University Press, 2014
Haydon Warren-Gash - Career Highlights, Experience and Skills, Foro Consulting

1949 births
Living people
Alumni of Sidney Sussex College, Cambridge
Ambassadors of the United Kingdom to Ivory Coast
Ambassadors of the United Kingdom to Niger
Ambassadors of the United Kingdom to Burkina Faso
Ambassadors of the United Kingdom to Liberia
Ambassadors of the United Kingdom to Morocco
Ambassadors of the United Kingdom to Mauritania
Ambassadors of the United Kingdom to Colombia
British lepidopterists